Dinbaghan (also Romanized as Dīnbāghān; also known as Deym-e Bāghān) is a village in Jowzar Rural District, in the Central District of Mamasani County, Fars Province, Iran. At the 2006 census, its population was 115, in 23 families.

References 

Populated places in Mamasani County